Euplanidae is a family of flatworms belonging to the order Polycladida.

Genera:
 Aprostatum Bock, 1913
 Diplopharyngeata Plehn, 1896
 Euplana Girard, 1893
 Euplanina Sopott-Ehlers & Schmidt, 1975
 Euplanoida Faubel, 1983
 Namyhplana Brusa & Damborenea, 2013
 Paraprostatum Faubel & Sluys, 2007
 Semonia Plehn, 1896
 Taenioplana Hyman, 1944

References

Platyhelminthes